Aleksandr Vladimirovich Mostovoi (born 22 August 1968) is a Russian former professional footballer who played as an attacking midfielder.

Known as O Zar de Balaídos ("The Tsar of Balaídos") from his lengthy spell at Celta de Vigo, he was often referred to as a 'genius playmaker' during his time there, in addition to a volatile temperament. He also played professionally in his own country, Portugal and France.

Mostovoi earned 50 caps for Russia in a 12-year international career, being chosen for two World Cups and as many European Championships. He previously represented the Soviet Union and the CIS.

Club career

Spartak and first abroad spell
Born in Lomonosov, Russia, Soviet Union, Mostovoi signed for national giants FC Spartak Moscow from second division club FC Presnya Moscow, quickly making an impression. In January 1992, he joined compatriots Vasili Kulkov and Sergei Yuran at S.L. Benfica; months before arriving, he was controversially awarded Portuguese citizenship through marriage, but never imposed himself in the first team.

Midway through 1993–94 Mostovoi joined Ligue 1 side Stade Malherbe Caen, then left after the sole season to fellow French side RC Strasbourg, rejoining coach Daniel Jeandupeux. With the latter, he first displayed glimpses of an emerging talent.

Celta
Mostovoi's big break came when he signed for Celta de Vigo in 1996, for 325 million pesetas (about €1.95 million). He made his debut for the Galicians in a 2–0 home defeat against Real Betis, and his creative play and key goals made him a cult figure at Balaídos as the club rose to near the top of La Liga standings year after year.

Affectionately nicknamed 'The Tsar of Balaídos' by the fans, Mostovoi formed an impressive midfield society with, amongst others, compatriot Valery Karpin, and helped Celta win the 2000 UEFA Intertoto Cup; the final was a 4–3 aggregate win over his hometown club FC Zenit Saint Petersburg. However, he could not help the freefall that hit the team in the 2003–04 season, relegating it to the second division after the player appeared in a career-worst (in his Celta career) 24 matches. His top-flight tally of 235 games for Celta was a club record until Hugo Mallo broke it in 2021.

Alavés
Having not played for over eight months, and at the age of 36, Mostovoi signed a contract with Dmitry Pietrman's Deportivo Alavés in early March 2005, initially until the end of the second level campaign. His first and only game came in a league game against Cádiz CF in which he came on as a substitute, in the 78th minute – he scored the Basques' only goal (and nearly added a second) in an eventual 1–3 defeat.

Having been with the club for only 30 days, Mostovoi told the club directors of his intention to retire claiming he was suffering from back problems.

International career
Mostovoi played for the Soviet national team, the CIS and Russia internationally. In another temper tantrum, he was sent home by team manager Georgi Yartsev during the latter's trip to UEFA Euro 2004, after questioning his methods. He played in the Euro 1996 and the 1994 FIFA World Cup and was also picked for the 2002 World Cup, but did not play in the latter tournament due to injury.

Mostovoi's exclusion from Euro 2004's national squad happened after the 0–1 group stage loss to Spain. Supposedly, the player talked with the media after the match and gave an interview saying that Yartsev was not a good coach and did not understand anything. This was later proven false, after Mostovoi gave another interview and explained he merely said that Yartsev overworked the players during practice, so they didn't have the necessary energy to play well in matches. All in all, group morale dropped after the incident, and Russia lost the second game to hosts Portugal.

In 2009, Mostovoi was part of the Russia squad that won the Legends Cup.

Retirement 
After retiring as a player, he repeatedly stated his desire and willingness to lead a football club as a manager. However, Mostovoi does not have the necessary UEFA coaching licences, which he does not want to obtain. Since 2011, he has expressed various versions of this decision: from doubts about obtaining new knowledge in coaching courses to corrupt schemes to obtain this licence by other specialists.

Personal life

Mostovoi graduated from college as an electrician, and later joined a sports academy in Moscow, which provided coaching to young players with a university education.

After losing the 2001 Copa del Rey Final, a group of Celta supporters raised four million pesetas to commission a statue of Mostovoi. The player approved and Maxín Picallo was chosen as the sculptor, but the project was never finished; he believed that his dip in form in 2003 affected enthusiasm in the endeavour.

He married Stéphanie in Strasbourg during his time playing in the city. His son of the same name, known by the hypocorism Sacha, trialled with S.L. Benfica B in 2016.

Career statistics

Club

International

|}

Honours

Club
Spartak Moscow
Soviet Top League: 1987, 1989

Benfica
Primeira Divisão: 1993–94
Taça de Portugal: 1992–93

Strasbourg
UEFA Intertoto Cup: 1995

Celta
UEFA Intertoto Cup: 2000
Copa del Rey runner-up: 2000-01

Country
Soviet Union
UEFA European Under-21 Championship: 1990

Russia
Legends Cup: 2009

References

External links

Izvestia profile 
RussiaTeam biography and profile 
Stats at LegionerKulichki 

1968 births
Living people
People from Lomonosov
Footballers from Saint Petersburg
Soviet footballers
Russian footballers
Association football midfielders
Soviet Top League players
Russian Premier League players
Primeira Liga players
Ligue 1 players
La Liga players
Segunda División players
FC Asmaral Moscow players
FC Spartak Moscow players
S.L. Benfica footballers
Stade Malherbe Caen players
RC Strasbourg Alsace players
RC Celta de Vigo players
Deportivo Alavés players
Dual internationalists (football)
Soviet Union under-21 international footballers
Soviet Union international footballers
Russia international footballers
1994 FIFA World Cup players
2002 FIFA World Cup players
UEFA Euro 1996 players
UEFA Euro 2004 players
Russian expatriate footballers
Expatriate footballers in France
Expatriate footballers in Portugal
Expatriate footballers in Spain
Russian expatriate sportspeople in France
Russian expatriate sportspeople in Portugal
Russian expatriate sportspeople in Spain